George Sherwood may refer to:

George Sherwood (Canadian politician) (1811–?), judge and political figure in Canada West
George Sherwood (sculptor) (born 1954), American kinetic and environmental sculptor
George Sherwood (actor) (1892–1983), American actor married to actress Pauline Starke
George Sherwood (British politician) (1878–1935), Member of Parliament for Wakefield, 1923–1924 and 1929–1931